Government College Umuahia, or GCU, is an independent secondary school for boys located on Umuahia-Ikot Ekpene road in Umuahia, Nigeria.

Twenty years after the establishment of Kings College, the first government-owned high school, by the British colonial government, three similar public schools were founded in 1929. These three institutions, Government College Umuahia (GCU), Government College, Ibadan and Government College Zaria (now Barewa College), were designed to follow the traditions of British public schools such as Eton, Harrow and Winchester. The GCU was known as the 'Eton of the East,' at that time because it was located in Nigeria's orient and was known for its elite standards and selectivity.

Rev. Robert Fisher was the founding principal of GCU.

On December 22, 2014, a Deed of Trust was signed with the Abia State government, thereby vesting the Fisher Educational Trust with all legal interests, rights and power pertaining to ownership, management, operation, control and funding of Government College Umuahia. The trust was set up by the Government College Umuahia Old Boys Association.

History
In 1927 the British Colonial Government in Lagos started three new secondary schools for boys, namely a school in Ibadan (Government College, Ibadan), in Zaria (now Barewa College) and in Umuahia (Government College Umuahia). King's College, Lagos had started twenty years earlier in 1909. These four schools were modeled after the famous English public schools – Eton and Harrow. The Queen's College, Lagos (for girls) had opened that year. The onus for starting the Government College Umuahia fell on an English educator, mathematician, and Anglican priest, the Rev. Robert Fisher who had been a teacher at the Achimota College, Accra, and education administrator in the Gold Coast, now Ghana. He served as the first principal of the Government College Umuahia from 1929 to 1939.

On January 29, 1929 he opened the gates of the school to 25 students drawn from all parts of Nigeria and West Africa, but with catchment in Eastern Nigeria, and the Southern Cameroons. The Government College Umuahia began in 1929 as a teacher training institute and in 1930, converted to a secondary school. Fisher ran this school until 1939 when, at the start of the Second World War, he left for England on retirement and was replaced by W. N. Tolfree. The school was closed thereafter, and for three years it was used as a Prisoner of War camp for detaining German and Italian prisoners captured in Cameroon by the British and the students and staff were suddenly dispersed to King's College, Lagos and to other mission schools east of the Niger.

Academics
GCU has drawn students from among the best performing from Nigeria and Southern Cameroons. It has classrooms and laboratories. Its students consistently achieve high scores in exam results at SSCE, O-Level and A-Level. All students complete core courses in the Arts and Sciences.

Students participate in sports like cricket, hockey, handball and football There are two standard fields (the Upper and Lower fields), cricket pavilions, seven lawn tennis courts, basketball court; and Olympic-size track field. It has a nine-hole golf course; a botanical garden, and an aquarium.

The English artist and archeologist, Kenneth C. Murray, pioneered modern art education in Nigeria when he left Balliol College, Oxford and arrived Nigeria in 1927 to teach art. He taught art at the Government College Umuahia from 1933 to 1939 and started the Art Gallery which had in its collection, the works of C.C. Ibeto, Uthman Ibrahim, and the early charcoal drawings of Ben Enwonwu. The gallery was looted and destroyed during the Nigerian-Biafra civil war (1967–70), when the school was closed to serve as the General Staff Headquarters of the secessionist Republic of Biafra. K.C. Murray himself had left Umuahia in 1939 to become Director/Surveyor of Nigerian Antiquities, and the editor of the Nigeria Magazine from work he did at Umuahia.

The Government College Umuahia also had an Officer Cadet Corps that offered instruction camps in field drills, and adventure training. It produced professionally trained military officers before the Nigerian civil war including General George Kurubo, first Southern Nigerian to be trained at Sandhurst and first Nigerian Chief of the Nigerian Air Force; General Alex Madiebo, General Officer Commanding the defunct Biafran Army, General Patrick Anwunah, Tony Eze, Tim Onwuatuegwu, C.C. Emelifonwu, Ibanga Ekanem, August Okpe, Col. (Dr.)Bassey Inyang, etc.

Government College Umuahia also produces an unusual high number of literary elite who influenced African Literature more than any other educational institution.

Notable alumni

 Chinua Achebe, writer, novelist, first winner of the Nigerian National Order of Merit
 Mofia Tonjo Akobo, Nigeria's first minister of petroleum
 Godswill Akpabio, Minister of Health for Eastern Nigeria
 Elechi Amadi, novelist, mathematician, surveyor, soldier and public administrator
 Kelechi Amadi-Obi, lawyer, painter and photographer
 Anthony Aniagolu, Supreme Court justice
 I. N. C. Aniebo, novelist and soldier
 Okoi Arikpo, anthropologist and Foreign Minister of Nigeria (1967–1975)
 Nimi Briggs, Vice Chancellor of the University of Port Harcourt
 Edmund Daukoru, doctor and Minister of Oil
 Lazarus Ekwueme, actor, professor, musicologist, winner of the Nigerian National Order of Merit
 Dick W. Emuchay, medical doctor, educator and administrator
 Okechukwu Nwadiuto Emuchay, diplomat
 E. M. L. Endeley, former premier of Southern Cameroon
 Okechukwu Enelamah, medical doctor and Nigeria's Minister of Industry, Trade and Investment
 Nelson Enwerem, model, television personality and winner of Mr Nigeria 2018
 Ben Enwonwu, modernist sculptor and painter and winner of the Nigerian National Order of Merit
 Kelsey Harrison, professor of obstetrics and gynaecology, former vice-chancellor of the University of Port Harcourt, winner of the Nigerian National Order of Merit
 Chukwuemeka Ike, novelist, university administrator, winner of the Nigerian National Order of Merit
 Orji Uzor Kalu
 Peter Katjavivi, diplomat and politician
 George T. Kurubo, brigadier and first Nigerian Chief of the Nigerian Air Force
 Alexander Madiebo, Nigerian military officer
 Victor Mukete, Nigeria's first minister of information and prominent Cameroonian politician
 Obi Nwakanma, Nigerian poet
 Okwesilieze Nwodo
 Chukwuedu Nwokolo
 Jide Obi, lawyer and pop star
 Gabriel Okara, poet
 J.O.J. Okezie, Nigeria's first minister of health
 Christopher Okigbo, poet and publisher
 Chu Okongwu, Minister of National Planning and Minister of Oil
 Domingo Okorie
 Charles Onyeama, World Court judge
 Idah Peterside, keeper for the Super Eagles
 Ken Saro-Wiwa, writer and environmental rights activist
 James Iroha Uchechukwu, sculptor and photographer
 Achike Udenwa
 Jaja Wachuku, lawyer, Nigeria's first Speaker of the House of Representatives and Nigeria's first foreign minister

References

Further reading
 The Education of a British-Protected Child: Essays (2009) - Chinua Achebe
 THERE WAS A COLLEGE: INTRODUCING THE UMUAHIAN: A GOLDEN JUBILEE PUBLICATION, ed CHINUA ACHEBE - Terri Ochiagha
 The Umuahian: A golden jubilee Edition ed Chinua Achebe (Umuahia: Government College, Umuahia Old Boys' Association 1979)
 Achebe and Friends at Umuahia: The Making of a Literary Elite (2015) - Terri Ochiagha
 Christopher Okigbo, 1930-67: Thirsting for Sunlight (2010) - Obi Nwakanma
 The Shining Ones: THE UMUAHIA SCHOOL DAYS OF OBINNA OKOYE - Chike Momah
 The African Writers' Handbook - James Gibbs, Jack Mapanje
 Early Nigerian Literature - Bernth Lindfors

External links
 The Government College's Website
 The Fisher Educational Development Trust's Website
 Government College Umuahia, Old Boys website

Secondary schools in Abia State
Boys' schools in Nigeria
Umuahia